Wilma is a female given name, a feminine form of William. People with the name include:

People
Wilma Arizapana (born 1982), Peruvian long-distance runner
Wilma van den Berg (born 1947), Dutch sprinter
Wilma M. Blom, marine scientist
Wilma Burgess (1939–2003), American singer
Wilma Chan (1949–2021), American politician
Wilma Lee Cooper (1921–2011), American singer
Wilma Cosmé (born 1966), Puerto Rican singer known as Sa-Fire
Wilma De Angelis (born 1931), Italian singer and TV presenter
Wilma Driessen (born 1938), Dutch opera singer
Wilma Dykeman (1920–2006), American writer
Wilma Elles (born 1986), German actress
Wilma de Faria, Brazilian politician, governor of Rio Grande do Norte
Wilma Anderson Gilman (1881-1971), American concert pianist, music teacher, clubwoman
Wilma Goich (born 1945), Italian pop singer and television personality
Wilma Scott Heide (1921–1985), American feminist author and social activist
Wilma van Hofwegen (born 1971), Dutch swimmer
Wilma Labate (born 1949), Italian film director and screenwriter.
Wilma Landkroon (born 1957), Dutch pop singer
Wilma B. Liebman (born 1950), American lawyer
Wilma Lipp (born 1925), Austrian operatic soprano
Wilma Mankiller (1945–2010), American politician and first female Cherokee chief
Wilma Mansveld (born 1962), Dutch Minister for the Environment
Wilma McCann (????–1975), the first victim of British serial killer Peter Sutcliffe
Wilma Montesi (1932–1953), Italian model and murder victim
Wilma Murto (born 1998), Finnish pole vaulter
Wilma Neruda (1838–1911), Czech violinist
Wilma Newhoudt-Druchen, South African politician
Wilma Pastrana (born 1970), Puerto Rican first lady
Wilma Rosbach (born 1921), American politician
Wilma Rudolph (1940–1994), American sprinter
Wilma Rusman (born 1958), Dutch long-distance runner
Wilma Salas (born 1991), Cuban volleyball player
Wilma Josefina Salgado (born 1952), Ecuadorian politician and economist
Wilma M. Sherrill (born 1939), American politician
Wilma Smith (born 1946), American newscaster
Wilma Smith (born 1956), Fijian-born violinist
Wilma Stockenström (born 1933), South Africa-born Afrikaans writer, translator, and actor
Wilma Subra (born 1943), American environmental scientist
Wilma Tisch (born 1927), American socialite and heiress
Wilma Vaught (born 1930), US Air Force brigadier general
Wilma van Velsen (born 1964), Dutch swimmer
Wilma Victor (1919–1987), American educator of Choctaw Indian descent
Wilma Webb (born 1944), American politician

Fictional characters
Wilma, in the Where's Wally? franchise
Wilma Bishop, from Strike Witches
Wilma Cameron, in the film The Best Years of Our Lives
Wilma Deering, in the television series Buck Rogers in the 25th Century 
Wilma Flintstone, in the animated television series The Flintstones
Wilma Page, in the Oxford University Press series The Magic Key by Roderick Hunt and Alex Brychta
Wilma Tenderfoot, titular character of a children's book series by Emma Kennedy

See also
 Wilma (disambiguation)

Feminine given names
Dutch feminine given names
English feminine given names